The Counter-Terrorism and Security Act 2015 is an Act of the Parliament of the United Kingdom. It came into force in July 2015.

Provisions

Part 1 Temporary restrictions on travel

Part 2 Terrorism prevention and investigation measures

Part 3 Data retention

Part 4 Aviation, shipping and rail

Part 5 Risk of being drawn into terrorism

Part 6 Amendments of or relating to the Terrorism Act 2000

Part 7 Miscellaneous and general

Drafting
The Counter-Terrorism and Security Bill was proposed by Home Secretary Theresa May in November 2014. The press reported it would require Internet service providers to retain data showing which IP address was allocated to a device at a given time. At that time, companies providing internet services were not required to keep records of extra data that can show which individuals have used a particular IP address at a given time, even though this information exists.

Justification 
The Home Secretary said the new bill would help security services "deal with the increased threat that we now see". She said "This is a step but it doesn't go all the way to ensuring that we can identify all the people we will need to". To "fully identify" everybody, she said police would need the power to access communication data, as previously proposed in the Draft Communications Data Bill.

Effects
In December 2015, under a remit of the act which places local authorities, prisons, NHS trusts and schools under a statutory duty to prevent extremist radicalisation taking place within their walls, teachers reported a 10-year-old boy to the police after he had misspelled the word "terraced" and written "I live in a terrorist house". He was subsequently interviewed by police and social services and had his home searched.

In February 2016, Ken Macdonald warned that the "prevent" aspect of the law risked a "chilling effect" on academic debate and a "deadening impact" on research at universities.

See also
 Terrorism Act 2000
 Counter-Terrorism Act 2008
 National Counter Terrorism Policing Network
 Counter Terrorism Command
 CONTEST
 Mass surveillance in the United Kingdom

References

United Kingdom Acts of Parliament 2015
National security policies
Home Office (United Kingdom)
Counterterrorism in the United Kingdom
Mass surveillance
Terrorism laws in the United Kingdom